Magdalena Fręch and Katarzyna Kawa were the defending champions but chose not to participate.

Caty McNally and Storm Sanders won the title, defeating Eri Hozumi and Miyu Kato in the final, 7–5, 4–6, [10–6].

Seeds

Draw

Draw

References
Main Draw

LTP Charleston Pro Tennis - Doubles
LTP Charleston Pro Tennis